Olena Anatoliïvna Sadovnycha (born November 4, 1967) is an archer from Ukraine who competed in the 1996 Summer Olympics and in the 2000 Summer Olympics.

In Atlanta she won the bronze medal in the individual event. Four years later she won the silver medal as part of the Ukrainian team.

References

1967 births
Living people
Sportspeople from Kyiv
Armed Forces sports society (Ukraine) athletes
Ukrainian female archers
Archers at the 1996 Summer Olympics
Archers at the 2000 Summer Olympics
Olympic archers of Ukraine
Olympic silver medalists for Ukraine
Olympic bronze medalists for Ukraine
Olympic medalists in archery
Medalists at the 2000 Summer Olympics

Medalists at the 1996 Summer Olympics